Mammiyur Krishnan Kutty Nair was a prominent modern day mural artist from Kerala, India. He also founded the Guruvayoor Devaswom Mural Painting Institute.  By finding space for mural art outside the temples, he advocated for its recognition as a legacy.  When Guruvayoor Devaswam wanted to renovate its murals after a fire in the early 1970s temple murals were renovated under Mammiyur Krishnan Kutty Nair's guidance.

See also
 Kerala mural painting

References

External links
 Mural Heritage of Kerala 

20th-century Indian painters
Painters from Kerala
Muralists
People from Guruvayur
Indian male painters
Year of birth missing
Year of death missing
20th-century Indian male artists

de:Wandmalerei
es:Mural
fr:Peinture murale
nl:Muurschildering
ja:壁画
pl:Mural
pt:Muralismo
ru:Монументальная живопись
fi:Muraali
zh:壁畫